The Late November 1984 Nor'easter occurred on the United States' Thanksgiving Day, November 22, 1984. A deep extratropical cyclone located just off the shore of Florida led to significant beach erosion and the grounding of the freighter Mercedes I for several months along the coastal town of Palm Beach. It formed unusually early, and its effects were seen unusually far south into Florida.

Meteorological history

When a cyclone aloft cut off from the main band of the Westerlies, it spurred cyclogenesis in the Florida Straits by November 22, which led to a nor'easter at an unusually southern latitude near the Bahamas. The surface cyclone slowly traveled through the Florida Straits up the Gulf Stream between Florida and the Bahamas before drifting back out to sea. The storm attempted to gain some central convection during several periods of its life cycle. It was at its most intense on November 23 and November 24, with a central pressure near 1005 hPa.  The cyclone moved far enough to the east to allow winds and seas to subside on November 26.  There is some evidence that it may have become a subtropical cyclone around November 28, while located in the vicinity of Bermuda.  This is why the system is considered the 19th tropical depression of the 1984 Atlantic hurricane season.

Effects

Significant rainfall was recorded along the Palm Beach County coast between November 21 and November 26 during this event, with local amounts of up to  measured at West Palm Beach, Florida. Surface temperatures hovered in the middle 50s°F, or around 13 °C, within the main region of impact. However, wind and high seas were the storm's main impact due to the strong pressure gradient between the cyclone's center and a 1040 hPa surface high over the Ohio Valley. Offshore the Atlantic coast, seas also reached . Coastal erosion took its toll between St. Augustine and Palm Beach during the three-day storm, which eventually subsided on November 26. About five-sixths of a new pier at St. Augustine was destroyed. Erosion from this cyclone would be the worst experienced in southern Brevard County until Hurricane Frances in 2004.

The storm dragged the 197-foot Venezuelan freighter Mercedes I ashore the coast of Palm Beach and through a seawall, where it remained in a socialite's backyard into early 1985. Once hauled out to sea, the vessel was sunk and became an artificial coral reef off Fort Lauderdale on March 30, 1985. A second freighter ran aground offshore Jacksonville. Damage from Vero Beach alone totalled US$3.4 million (1984 dollars). Martin County reported an addition US$4 million in losses (1984 dollars). One person perished.

Other significant Florida extratropical cyclones

The top three deadliest tornado outbreaks in the state's history occurred with extratropical cyclones in February 1998, March 1962, and April 1966.  In 1989, a December cyclone spun up offshore northeast Florida, bringing measureable snow to Jacksonville and flurries across Sarasota in west-central Florida, and some Lake Okeechobee-effect snows downwind of the lake.
Later that day, flurries were witnessed across the Florida Panhandle in its wake. A frontal wave which became a powerful Christmas 1994 Nor'easter moved across Florida, bringing windy and rainy conditions to the state.

See also
Climate of Florida
Extratropical cyclone
Surface weather analysis

References

Printed Media
Weather Log, November 1984. Mariners Weather Log.  Spring 1985: pp. 91–92.

External links
  Florida Shipwrecks:  Mercedes I

Natural disasters in Florida
1984 meteorology
Nor'easters
1984 natural disasters in the United States
November 1984 events in the United States